Rodney Franklin (born September 16, 1958) is an American jazz pianist and composer.

Biography
Franklin was born in Berkeley, California in September, 1958. In 1964, aged six, he took jazz piano lessons at the Washington Elementary School and was taught by Dr Herb Wong who was a jazz journalist, disc jockey and music teacher. In 1972 at the young age of 14 he led the funk-jazz band In One Piece (alt. In One Peace) performing his first 3 recordings at a studio in Ray Dobar's House of Music in Berkeley, California. Produced by George Semper, only one of the songs has been released on the 2003 Inner City Sounds 2X LP Compilation released on Luv N'Haight Ubiquity Recordings.

Prior to signing up with CBS Records in 1978, Franklin worked with John Handy in San Francisco, as well as Bill Summers, Freddie Hubbard and Marlena Shaw.

His debut CBS album was In the Center (1978), a jazz fusion album featuring "On the Path" and "I Like the Music Make It Hot".  Although aged 20 when he recorded the album, he had already developed his own sound which was influenced by McCoy Tyner and George Duke, Chick Corea, Lonnie Liston Smith and George Semper.

In 1980 the album You'll Never Know he had major chart success with "The Groove" (it reached number 7 in the UK Singles Chart). The track was released on both 7" and 12" format. It created a UK dance craze called 'The Freeze' which was started up by DJ Chris Hill.

Additional albums which were also recorded on the CBS label have included Rodney Franklin (1980), Endless Flight (1981), Learning to Love (1982), Marathon (1984) (probably his most famous in the UK, produced by bass player Stanley Clarke and the LP which released a single called Stay on in the Groove), Skydance (1985) and It Takes Two (1986).

In 1988 he moved over to the BMG record label and recorded Diamond Inside of You which introduced vocals by Jennifer Holliday on the single, "Gotta Give It Up". In addition, Franklin has also produced and released an album on Nova Records called Love Dancin'  in 1992.

Discography

Albums

Singles

References

External links
 Rodney Franklin discography at SoulAndFunkmusic.com
 
  video "Stay On in the Groove" (1984)
 Liner notes at ubiquityrecords.com

1958 births
Living people
Musicians from Berkeley, California
American jazz pianists
American male pianists
American jazz composers
American male jazz composers
20th-century American pianists
Jazz musicians from California
21st-century American pianists
20th-century American male musicians
21st-century American male musicians